The Serbian Orthodox Eparchy of Austria and Switzerland or Serbian Orthodox Diocese of Austria and Switzerland is an eparchy (diocese) of the Serbian Orthodox Church, created in 2011, with jurisdiction over Serbian Orthodox churches in Austria, Switzerland, Italy and Malta. Its headquarters are located in Vienna, Austria.

History 
Serbian Orthodox Church has a long historical presence on the territory of modern Eparchy of Austria and Switzerland. By the end of the Middle Ages, migration of Eastern Orthodox Serbs towards Austrian lands was caused by expansion of the Ottoman Empire. Exiled members of Serbian royal and noble families were welcomed by Habsburg rulers, who granted them new possessions. In 1479, emperor Friedrich III granted castle Weitensfeld in Carinthia to exiled members of Branković dynasty of Serbia. Often accompanied by their priests, exiled Serbian families created first Eastern Orthodox cells in Austrian lands.

During the period of Ottoman–Habsburg wars (from 16th to 18th century), Habsburg policy towards Eastern Orthodox Serbs was marked by special interests, related to complex political and religious situation in various regions of the expanding Habsburg monarchy. Emperor Leopold I issued several charters (1690, 1691, 1695) to Eastern Orthodox Serbs, who sided with Habsburgs during the Vienna War (1683-1699), granting them religious freedom in the Monarchy. Serbian Orthodox patriarch Arsenije III visited Austrian capital (Vienna) on several occasions, and died there in 1706.    

Serbian Orthodox metropolitan Isaija Đaković, who visited Austrian capital on several occasions since 1690, also died in Vienna, in 1708. During the 18th and 19th century, communities of ethnic Serbs were developing in several Austrian cities, consisted mainly of merchants, officers and students, who were under the spiritual jurisdiction of the Serbian Orthodox Metropolitanate of Karlovci.

See also

 Eastern Orthodoxy in Austria
 Eastern Orthodoxy in Italy
 Serbs in Austria
 Serbs in Switzerland
 Serbs in Italy

References

Literature

External links
 Diocese of Austria and Switzerland 
 Handover of the newly established Diocese of Austria-Switzerland
 Constitutional session of diocesan bodies of the Diocese of Austria-Switzerland held in Vienna
 Bishop Andrej of Austria-Switzerland enthroned
 Biography of newly-elected Serbian Orthodox Bishop Andrej (Cilerdzic) of Austria-Switzerland

Religious sees of the Serbian Orthodox Church
Serbian Orthodox Church in Austria
Serbian Orthodox Church in Switzerland
Serbian Orthodox Church in Italy